Carbohydrate sulfotransferase 4 is an enzyme that in humans is encoded by the CHST4 gene.

References

Further reading

External links